The 1979 Buffalo Bills season was the franchise's 10th season in the National Football League, and 20th overall.

Head coach Chuck Knox spent his second season with the Bills in 1979, improving on 1978's record by two games. The Bills were 7–6 with three games left to play, but they lost their final three games to finish with a losing record. (Even if Buffalo had won their final three games, they still would have lost the head-to-head tiebreaker to the Miami Dolphins (who finished 10–6) for the division title.)

Buffalo's loss to Miami in Week Seven was their 20th straight loss to the Dolphins, an NFL record.

The 1979 Bills were dead-last in rushing yards in the NFL, with only total 1,621 yards on the ground. Buffalo's 268 points scored was 23rd of the league's 28 teams.

Offseason

NFL draft 

Three of Buffalo's first four picks made at least one Pro Bowl: wide receiver Jerry Butler, nose tackle Fred Smerlas, and linebacker Jim Haslett. Haslett was named 1979 AP Rookie of the Year. Smerlas made five Pro Bowls in 1980, 1981, 1982, 1983 and 1988.

Defensive end Ken Johnson, center Jon Borchardt, and defensive backs Jeff Nixon and Rod Kush all played for the Bills for six years from 1979 to 1984.

Tom Cousineau 

Ohio State linebacker Cousineau was drafted first overall in the 1979 NFL Draft by the Bills, who acquired the pick from San Francisco in a trade for O. J. Simpson. Cousineau never played a game with the Bills. He instead signed with the Canadian Football League's Montreal Alouettes where they offered double the money that the Bills originally offered. Cousineau became a star there, becoming the Grey Cup Most Valuable Player in the 1979 season. Cousineau wanted to return to the NFL, and in 1982 the Houston Oilers attempted to sign him, but the Bills (who still held Cousineau's NFL rights) matched the offer. He was then traded from the Bills to the Cleveland Browns for a first-round draft choice (14th overall) in the 1983 NFL Draft, which would be used on future Hall of Fame quarterback Jim Kelly. Cousineau signed a five-year contract for 2.5 million dollars, the most ever for a Cleveland Brown player at the time.[5]

Personnel

Staff/coaches

Roster

Regular season

Schedule 

Note: Intra-division opponents are in bold text.

Standings

Season summary

Week 13 at Patriots

Notes

References 

 Bills on Pro Football Reference
 Bills on jt-sw.com
 Bills Stats on jt-sw.com

Buffalo Bills seasons
Buffalo Bills
Buffalo